The Election Commission of India held indirect 13th Presidential elections of India on 19 July 2007. Pratibha Patil with 638,116 votes won over her nearest rival Bhairon Singh Shekhawat who got 331,306 votes. This result meant that Pratibha Patil became the first female President of India.

Candidates

Official candidates

On 14 June, Pratibha Patil, the governor of the state of Rajasthan, was declared by UPA as its candidate for the election. The Left and other allies of the United Progressive Alliance (UPA) such as Bahujan Samaj Party (BSP) and Dravida Munnetra Kazhagam (DMK) announced their support on Patil's candidature. Shiv Sena, an ally of the National Democratic Alliance (NDA) also supported Patil's candidature. The move came as a surprise as Patil's name was not mentioned among the probables by UPA so far.

Supported unofficially by the NDA, the then Vice President, Bhairon Singh Shekhawat filed his nomination as an independent candidate on 25 June 2007.

Potential candidates

Amidst much speculation by various party leaders and media, a lot of names were tossed around as being probable or desired persons for holding the post.

Initially Shivraj Patil and Pranab Mukherjee (both sitting cabinet ministers) emerged as the frontrunners for the candidature. Other names which did the rounds in the UPA camp include Sushil Kumar Shinde and Karan Singh. Pranab Mukherjee was stated to be too critical at his current responsibility to stand for the presidential elections and the Left parties opposed the candidature of Shivaraj Patil, Sushil Kumar Shinde and Karan Singh.

On the other hand, the NDA stated that it would support Bhairon Singh Shekhawat, in case he decides to contest as an independent candidate.

Other probables such as N.R. Narayana Murthy who received significant media hype did not appear to have gathered any support from any of the sides. Atal Bihari Vajpayee, a former prime minister who would have been NDA's probable candidate denied his desire to become the next president.

On 18 June, a set of parties with allegiance neither to UPA or NDA—All India Anna Dravida Munnetra Kazhagam (AIADMK), Telugu Desam Party (TDP) and Samajwadi Party (SP)—formed an alliance called the United National Progressive Alliance and announced their support for a second term for the incumbent, Abdul Kalam. On 20 June a delegation of United National Progressive Alliance (UNPA) met Dr. Kalam with a request to contest the presidential elections, to which he replied that he is willing to contest only if there is a certainty of winning and that he is willing to wait for a few days for this certainty. However, he soon announced he would not run.

On 14 July 2007, Tamil Nadu Legislative Assembly (Leader of Opposition) J. Jayalalitha announced that the UNPA unanimously decided to abstain from the presidential polls.  However, the Election Commission of India held that the UNPA cannot ask its legislators to abstain from voting, quoting Section 171 C of the Indian Penal Code (IPC).

Process

As per the electoral calculation following were the number of votes for respective political parties.
Electoral College (India)

Figures are based upon Wayback Machine and Rajya Sabha. Figure on Lok Sabha and Vidhan Sabha seats do not take into consideration splits, mergers, defections, expulsions and by-elections after general elections have been held.

Know Pratibha Patil
Know Pratibha Patil is part of the political campaign launched by the Bharatiya Janata Party (BJP) for the presidential election of 2007. It consists of a website and a PDF booklet (titled "Presidential Election 2007"), created by the BJP under the banner of Project India. Both contain the party's allegation in the form of a compilation of articles from various media. While announcing the website at a press conference, the BJP party general secretary Arun Jaitley also distributed a printed form of the booklet and described it as a compilation of articles / editorials from newspapers on the Presidential contest.

The stated objective of the site is to "educate the people about Pratibha Patil, the nominee of UPA and Indian left for Indian presidential election scheduled on 19 July 2007". To support this, the website consists of various sections like 'Cartoon,' 'Pratibhaspeak' and 'UPA Doublespeak' and includes links to video clippings and articles that refer to the various allegations levelled against Pratibha Patil.
 
The website declares : 

 
BJP leader Arun Jaitley talking to news-persons called the website a "campaign to provide an informed choice to the electorate (the electoral college)". "The voter has a right to the information about the candidate he is voting for. This effort is intended for an informed choice of the electorate," Jaitley said.
 
Arun Jaitley did not respond when asked what would happen to the right of information when people are "informed" only about one of the two presidential candidates. He said the website would vanish after 21 July, when the presidential election result will be out.

However, the website can still be viewed via archive.org
 
An INC spokesperson commented:

BJP division 
The Times of India  BJP leaders had initially looked divided over supporting this campaign against Pratibha Patil. Party chief Rajnath Singh seemed reluctant to be drawn into a "personal attack" while senior party leader L. K. Advani spoke at length on the "pliant President" issue at the party's national executive last month. Daily News and Analysis also reported on the apparent differences among senior leaders on this campaign and had this quote:

Results

Source:

References

External links
Election Commission of India Official Site
President of India Official Site

2007 elections in India
2007